Seifeldin Ali Edris Farah (born 30 November 1979) is a Sudanese footballer who plays for Al-Hilal FC in the Sudan Premier League. He is the member of the Sudan National Football Team. He plays as a defensive midfielder. He is known for his hair having white colour in front.

Honours

Clubs
Al-Hilal Club
Sudan Premier League
Champion (7):2006, 2007, 2009, 2010, 2012, 2014, 2016
Sudan Cup
Winner (3):2009, 2011, 2016
Al-Ahly Shendi
Sudan Cup
Winner (1):2017

National
Sudan National Football Team
CECAFA Cup
Champion (1):2007

Internationalgoals

References

1979 births
Living people
2008 Africa Cup of Nations players
2011 African Nations Championship players
2012 Africa Cup of Nations players
Al-Hilal Club (Omdurman) players
Al-Ahly Shendi players
Sudanese footballers
Sudan international footballers
People from Khartoum
Association football midfielders
Sudan Premier League players
Sudan A' international footballers